Annabell Krebs Culverwell (June 13, 1902 – April 9, 1998) was an American painter. She took the name Columba when signing her paintings and writings, probably related to the constellation Columba, which is the focal point of several Egyptian pyramids. Her parents were Anna Frantz (1867–1930) and Dr. Stanley LeFevre Krebs (1864–1935). Her father was a one time president of the American University of Trade and Applied Commerce of Philadelphia and a pastor in the Reformed Church. He wrote the book "Trick Methods of Eusapia Paladino" (1910), exposing the tricks of the medium Eusapia Palladino. His second marriage was to Marjorie Main of Ma and Pa Kettle fame.

Biography
When about 11 years old, she lived In Europe for three years. It is claimed that, at age fifteen, she had her first psychic experience; a vision, while living in Wayne, Pennsylvania. After her marriage in 1921, to Frank J. Culverwell, she lived for a time in Singapore, where she began the study of Theosophy, and then in Calcutta and Darjeeling, India. She lived for a time near Joshua Tree National Monument in California. During this time she met and worked with several of America's first UFO contactees.

Columba maintained an address in East Orange, New Jersey, studied at Hood College and the New York School of Fine and Applied Arts. She exhibited at the Hall of Art in New York in 1932 and 1933; Salons of Art in 1934: Strauss Galleries in New York in 1950. She also exhibited in Bloomfield and Newark, New Jersey. She produced mural panels for Textile H.S., known today as Bayard Rustin Educational Complex, New York. She was a member of the St. Petersburg Arts Club and Newark Arts Club. She held positions as President of Skuddabud Creations from 1936 to 1940 which published a Christian Socialist science fiction book for kids by the same name. Owned Heated Doll Company from 1941 through 1945. She was the owner of Symbolant Company.

Some of her first drawings were of a political nature to support the Christian Socialist movement in New York City, as was her publication, "The Adventures of Skuddabud" and a  cartoon strip by the same name in comic magazines in Brazil and Mexico.

Lectures and presentations
She gave presentations on “The Mysteries of Man and the Universe” illustrated with color slides,"The Mysteries of. Human Nature," stressing' phenomena such as mental telepathy and kindred experiences. Mrs. Krebs Culverwell even dressed in Oriental costume, to give an illustrated lecture on “Symbolic Art of Life's Marvels.”

Paintings and drawings
Her paintings were named after the subjects they portrayed. "The Tree of Character, The Magnet of Art Patronage," "Our Conscious, Sub- Conscious and Super-Consciousness," "Mental Magnifying Glasses," "The Boomerang Law," "Our Various Bodies," "The Four Planes of Vibration," "Good and Evil Influences and one which Harwood Fisher commented on in his publication “The Subjective Self: A portrait Inside Logical Space. Mr. Fisher stated “Lastly, depictions of the spiral in cosmic art have the same themes of origin, creativity, and forms that move to the future. An interesting illustration is a painting by Columba Krebs called the “Universal Kingdom” (1956, reproduced in Piper and Piper 1975”.

Writings
Columba Krebs wrote an afterword to the 1970 book The People of the Planet Clarion and assisted UFO contactee-author Truman Bethurum with all three of his later books; she notes that Bethurum seemed obsessed by the voluptuous alien Captain Aura Rhanes, and had hired a secretary whom (according to Bethurum) very closely resembled the humanoid Captain Rhanes.

“The Moon is Inhabited" was written by Columba. It was produced in mimeographed form on a tan paper. The publication had light  blue covers with Illustrations of two people on a planet with some form of habitation in what appears to be a crater. There are several types of “flying saucers” and rocket ships in the air. The back cover has a drawing with palm trees and a tube type edifice with a glass dome and a king sitting on a throne inside. Some type of ray has melted a portion of the dome and is either sending down or beaming up humans and animals. There are also illustrations inside the front and back cover. The profits from the sale of this  publication were to go to the Cosmic Arts Shrine.

Notations on two of Columba's publications appear in “UFO's and the Extraterrestrial Contact Movement a bibliography”.
Volume One: Unidentified Flying Objects by George M. Eberhart  The Scarecrow Press Inc. Metuchen, N. J. 1986

Columba Krebs appeared in Who Was Who in American Art, 1564–1975

References

1998 deaths
1902 births
People from Westmoreland County, Pennsylvania
American occultists
20th-century American painters
American women painters
20th-century American women artists
Painters from Pennsylvania
Hood College alumni
Parsons School of Design alumni